Delfina Acosta (born December 24, 1956) is a Paraguayan poet and short story writer.

Acosta is a native of Asunción, and is by profession a pharmacist. Interested in literature from youth, she began her career as a published poet when some of her verse appeared in Poesía itinerante in 1984. Among her works are several collections of poetry and of short stories. Her Versos de amor y de locura received the PEN/Edward and Lily Tuck Award for Paraguayan Literature in 2012. She has received a number of other awards for her work as well.

Works
 Poesía itinerante (1984)
 Todas las voces, mujer (1986)
 La cruz del colibrí (1993)
 Pilares de Asunción (1987)
 Versos esenciales, como homenaje al poeta chileno Pablo Neruda (2001)
 Romancero de mi pueblo (2003)
 El viaje, short stories (1995)
 Querido mío (2004)
 Versos de amor y de locura

References

1956 births
Living people
Paraguayan women poets
Paraguayan short story writers
Women short story writers
20th-century Paraguayan poets
20th-century Paraguayan women writers
20th-century short story writers
21st-century Paraguayan poets
21st-century Paraguayan women writers
21st-century short story writers
Paraguayan pharmacists
Women pharmacists
People from Asunción